Satyanarayan Singh  was an Indian politician and a Member of Parliament in the 4th Lok Sabha. He represented the Varanasi constituency of Uttar Pradesh and was a member of the Communist Party of India (Marxist) political party.

Early life and education
Satyanarayan Singh was born in Khajurahvan, Jaunpur district in UP. His father was Aditya Narayan Singh.

Singh received his early education in Deoband (UP) but soon quit his education to become a full-time politician.

Political life

Singh was associated with the Hindustan Socialist Republican Army and the Revolutionary Socialist Party. Both pre- and post-Indian Independence, owing to his political activities and affiliation, he was imprisoned on various occasions. He also had to remain underground for a considerable time.

Singh was elected to the Lok Sabha in the 1967 general election. He received 105,784 votes (37.55% of the votes in the Varanasi constituency).

Singh died from COVID-19 in 2020.

Posts held

See also

4th Lok Sabha
Politics of India
Parliament of India
Government of India

References 

1923 births
2020 deaths
India MPs 1967–1970
Communist Party of India (Marxist) politicians from Uttar Pradesh
People from Varanasi district
Lok Sabha members from Uttar Pradesh
Politicians from Varanasi
Deaths from the COVID-19 pandemic in India